Woodridge Estates, Alberta may refer to:

Woodridge Estates, Parkland County, Alberta, a locality in Parkland County, Alberta
Woodridge Estates, Sturgeon County, Alberta, a locality in Sturgeon County, Alberta